The following is a list of people from Butte, Montana, including notable persons who were born and/or have resided in Butte.

(B) indicates that the person was born in Butte.

A
Colt Anderson, NFL defensive back (B)
Eden Atwood, jazz vocalist
Rudy Autio, ceramist, sculptor (B)

B
John Banovich, artist (B)
Mary Bard, author (B)
Lauretta Bender, pioneering neuropsychologist (B)
John W. Bonner, Governor of Montana (B)
Rosemarie Bowe, actress (B)
Patricia Briggs, fantasy author (B)
Myron Brinig, writer
Mark Britton, internet executive, venture capitalist and lawyer (B)
Scott Brow, MLB pitcher (B)
John Francis Buckley, member of the House of Commons of Canada (B)
Daniel Bukvich, composer; faculty, University of Idaho Moscow (B)

C
Albert J. Campbell, United States Representative from Montana
Kathryn Card, actress (B)
William Andrews Clark, copper magnate and politician
William Andrews Clark Jr., philanthropist, founder of Los Angeles Philharmonic
Amanda Curtis, Montana House of Representatives

D
John Duykers, operatic tenor (B)

E
Barbara Ehrenreich, author (B)
Julian Eltinge, actor and female impersonator
J. R. Eyerman, photographer

F
Herb Flemming, jazz trombonist (B)
Henry Frank, businessman and Butte mayor

G
George F. Grant, innovative fly tier, author, and conservationist
Kirby Grant, actor (B)
Karla M. Gray, Chief Justice of the Montana Supreme Court, worked in Butte

H
Dashiell Hammett,  author (The Maltese Falcon), once worked for Pinkerton National Detective Agency
Bobby Hauck, college football coach
Tim Hauck, NFL defensive back, coach (B)
John Haughm, musician and artist
F. Augustus Heinze, copper magnate
Sonny Holland, football coach and player

J
Sam Jankovich, football player, coach, administrator (B)
Keith Jardine, mixed martial artist (B)
Solon Johnson, miner, prospector and former Wisconsin legislator
Rob Johnson, MLB catcher
Helmi Juvonen, artist (B)

K
Pat Kearney, late KXLF-TV newscaster, author and historian (B)
Robert "Evel" Knievel, motorcycle daredevil (B)
Robbie Knievel, motorcycle daredevil and son of Evel (B)
Ella J. Knowles Haskell, first woman to practice law in Montana

L
Ethan Laidlaw, actor (B)
Robert C. Lautman, photographer (B)
Rose Hum Lee, sociologist (B)
Andrea Leeds, actress (B)
Levi Leipheimer, Olympic cycling medalist, two-time U.S. champion (B)
Frank Little, union leader lynched in Butte
Paul B. Lowney, humorist, author of At Another Time — Growing up in Butte (B)
Sonny Lubick, football coach at Colorado State University 1993-2007 (B)

M
Jack McAuliffe, former Green Bay Packers halfback (B)
Donald McCaig, writer (B)
Betty MacDonald, humor writer
Michael McFaul,  Oxford scholar, Stanford University professor, and former US Ambassador to Russia
Mike McGrath, Montana Attorney General (B)
Mary MacLane, feminist author and "Wild Woman of Butte"
Mike Mansfield, U.S. senator from Montana, longest-serving Senate Majority Leader and former US Ambassador to Japan
Lee Mantle, United States Senator from Montana
Judy Martz, Olympic speed skater and Governor of Montana
Donald W. Molloy, U.S. district judge (B)
Joseph P. Monaghan, United States Representative from Montana (B)

O
Bob O'Billovich, CFL executive, former CFL player, coach, and administrator (B)
Robert O'Neill, Navy SEAL who is credited with killing Osama bin Laden in Operation Neptune Spear, joined in hostage rescues during the Maersk Alabama hijacking and Operation Red Wings; later a motivational speaker (B)
Pat Ogrin, NFL defensive lineman (B)
Arnold Olsen, United States Congressman from Montana (B)

P
Jean Parker, actress 
Aaron Parrett, author, musician, letterpress printer 
Erin Popovich, Paralympic swimmer, gold medalist and world record holder
Milt Popovich, professional football player (B)

R
Bernard Ramm, theologian (B)
Martha Raye, film and television actress, singer (B)
John E. Rickards, first Lieutenant Governor of Montana
Fritzi Ridgeway, actress
William Rockefeller, financier
Jim Rotondi, jazz trumpeter, composer, educator (B)

S
Michael Sells, professor of Islamic Studies at the University of Chicago (B)
Brian Sullivan, member of the Washington House of Representatives (B)
Jim Sweeney, former head football coach at Washington State University and longtime head coach at Fresno State University (B)

T
Montana Taylor, pianist (B)
George Leo Thomas, Bishop of Helena
Jacob Thorkelson, United States Representative from Montana
Charlotte Towle, academic and social worker (B)
Robert Tryon, behavioral psychologist (B)

V
Wayne S. Vucinich, historian and academic (B)

W
 John Walsh, former Lieutenant Governor of Montana, United States Senator and Adjutant General of the Montana National Guard (B)
 Jack Weyland, physicist, academic (B)
Burton K. Wheeler, United States Senator from Montana
Griff Williams, painter (B)
Kathlyn Williams, actress (B)
Bryon Wilson, skier, Olympic bronze medalist (B).

See also
History of Butte, Montana

References

 
Butte, Montana
Lists of people from Montana